The 1924 BYU Cougars football team was an American football team that represented Brigham Young University (BYU) as a member of the Rocky Mountain Conference (RMC) during the 1924 college football season. In their third season under head coach Alvin Twitchell, the Cougars compiled an overall record of 2–3–1 with a mark of 1–3–1 in conference play, finished ninth in the RMC, and were outscored by a total of 61 to 44.

Schedule

References

BYU
BYU Cougars football seasons
BYU Cougars football